Sargent Glacier is a steep-walled tributary glacier, flowing southeast from the Herbert Range to enter Axel Heiberg Glacier just southeast of Bell Peak. Probably first seen by Roald Amundsen's polar party in 1911, the glacier was mapped by the Byrd Antarctic Expedition, 1928–30. Named by Advisory Committee on Antarctic Names (US-ACAN) for Howard H. Sargent III who made ionospheric studies at the South Pole Station in 1964.

Glaciers of Amundsen Coast